Donald McAlpine ACS, ASC (born 13 April 1934) is an Australian cinematographer.

Biography

Early life and career
Before his film career, McAlpine was a physical education teacher in Parkes, New South Wales, Australia. He began using a 16mm Camera to film athletes preparing for the Melbourne Olympic Games.

McAlpine's early career in Australia found him collaborating with other great Australian filmmakers from 1972 to 1981. In particular, Bruce Beresford. McAlpine filmed many of Beresford's early films including, The Adventures of Barry McKenzie, Barry McKenzie Holds His Own, Don's Party, The Getting of Wisdom, Money Movers, Breaker Morant and The Club. McAlpine also worked with another great Australian filmmaker, Gillian Armstrong, in My Brilliant Career.

After three of McAlpine's films were released in New York, My Brilliant Career, Breaker Morant and The Getting of Wisdom, Director Paul Mazursky noticed McAlpine's work and offered him the chance to travel to Greece to work on the film Tempest. After a successful shoot, work in the United States began to find its way to McAlpine.

Work on acclaimed films
McAlpine has filmed some of the most acclaimed films and was also nominated for an Academy Award for his work in Moulin Rouge! He is a member of both the Australian Cinematographers Society and the American Society of Cinematographers.  The A.S.C. honored him with the 2009 International Achievement Award. In 2016 McAlpine received an honorary doctorate in Arts from Edith Cowan University in Perth, Western Australia.

Filmography
Film

Television

References

External links 

1934 births
Living people
Australian cinematographers
People from New South Wales